Seeing Things may refer to:

 Hallucination, a perception in the absence of a stimulus

Film and television 
 Seein' Things (1924 film), a silent comedy short film
 Seein' Things (1908 film), a French short silent comedy film
 Seeing Things (1930 film), a film directed by Harold Beaudine
 Seeing Things (TV series), a 1980s Canadian series
 "Seeing Things" (Corner Gas), an episode of Corner Gas
 "Seeing Things" (Covies), an episode of the web series Covies

Literature and art 
 Seeing Things (poetry collection), a 1991 poetry collection by Seamus Heaney
 Seeing Things, a 1920 play by Margaret Mayo and Aubrey Kennedy
 Seeing Things: Television in the Age of Uncertainty, a 2000 book by John Ellis
 Seeing Things, a 2000 autobiography by Oliver Postgate
 Seeing Things, a 2005 art book by Jim Woodring
 "Seeing Things", a short story by Ian Rankin, included in his 1992 collection A Good Hanging and Other Stories
 "Seeing Things", a 1944–1969 column in The Saturday Review by the drama critic John Mason Brown

Music 
 Seeing Things (album), an album by Jakob Dylan
 "Seeing Things", a song by Aaron Lines from Waitin' on the Wonderful
 "Seeing Things", a song by Bizzy Bone from Speaking in Tongues
 "Seeing Things", a song by The Black Crowes from Shake Your Money Maker
 "Seeing Things", a song by Zero 7 from The Garden
 "Seeing Things", a song from the 1963 musical Here's Love
 "Seeing Things", a song from the 1968 musical The Happy Time